Remembering Bud Powell is an album by pianist Chick Corea and Friends performing tunes by Bud Powell. It was released on Corea's Stretch label in 1997.

Reception 

The AllMusic review by Scott Yanow said "Rather than play revivalist bebop, Corea and his associates (after authentically stating the melody) perform modern post bop improvisations in their own styles, so much of the music is way beyond bop ... All of the talented musicians have a fair amount of solo space and sound consistently inspired, making this a very successful and easily recommended project". The Penguin Guide to Jazz Recordings describes the album as “a small triumph, an understated and affectionate album that gives a clear impression of its subject - as understood by a follower - but without succumbing to sycophancy.

In the 40th Annual Grammy Awards, this album was nominated as Best Jazz Instrumental Performance, Individual or Group.

Track listing 
All compositions by Bud Powell except where noted
 "Bouncing with Bud" (Bud Powell, Walter Fuller) – 7:58
 "Mediocre" – 8:48
 "Willow Grove" – 9:56
 "Dusk in Sandi" – 8:06
 "Oblivion" – 7:14
 "Bud Powell" (Chick Corea) – 6:20
 "I'll Keep Loving You" – 9:06
 "Glass Enclosure" – 3:20
 "Tempus Fugit" – 9:28
 "Celia" – 3:00

Personnel 
 Chick Corea – piano
 Wallace Roney – trumpet (tracks 1-3, 5, 6, 8 & 9)
 Kenny Garrett –alto saxophone (tracks 3, 5 & 6)
 Joshua Redman – tenor saxophone (tracks 1-3 & 7-9) 
 Christian McBride - bass (tracks 1-9)
 Roy Haynes – drums (tracks 1-6, 8 & 9)

References 

Chick Corea albums
1997 albums
Stretch Records albums